ARFU may refer to:

 Alberta Rugby Football Union
 Auckland Rugby Football Union
 Asian Rugby Football Union